Charlie Taylor (5 April 1918 – 9 May 2000) was a Barbadian cricketer. He played in sixteen first-class matches for the Barbados cricket team from 1941 to 1952.

See also
 List of Barbadian representative cricketers

References

External links
 

1918 births
2000 deaths
Barbadian cricketers
Barbados cricketers
People from Saint Michael, Barbados
Barbadian emigrants to Canada